United Macedonian Organisation: Ilinden–Pirin (Обединена македонска организация: Илинден–Пирин) is a Macedonian organisation in Bulgaria, whose self-declared aims are protection of the human rights, language and nationality of the Macedonian minority in the country. In Bulgaria itself the organization is regarded as a foreign government-funded separatist organization.

History
In 1999, the organisation was registered as a political party and took part in the municipal elections the same year. The party polled approximately 3,000 votes in the party's core region, Blagoevgrad Province, in line with the number of self-declared ethnic Macedonians in the region according to the Bulgarian census at the time (3,100 in 2001). The party received, however, almost no votes in the rest of the country.

On February 29, 2000, by decision of the Bulgarian Constitutional Court, UMO Ilinden–Pirin was expelled from the Bulgarian political system, as a separatist party. On November 25, the European Court of Human Rights in Strasbourg, condemned Bulgaria because of violations of the OMO Ilinden–Pirin's freedom of organising meetings. The court stated that Bulgaria had violated Act 11 from the European Convention of Human Rights.

On 26 June 2006, the party held a new founding meeting in the southwestern town of Gotse Delchev despite an IMRO-BNM protest demonstration. IMRO-BNM deputy Boris Yachev accused the Macedonian government of sponsoring the party with €75,000 and called for the recall of the Macedonian ambassador Abdurahman Aliti. The party's leader, Stojko Stojkov, called the party Bulgarian and not ethnically based.

On July 30 Sofia's City Court confirmed the decision to deny registration; the arguments advanced by the court were, among others, that the necessary quorum of 530 signatures had not been reached and that there were many irregularities among those presented.  

UMO Ilinden–Pirin has been accepted as a full member of the European Free Alliance in April 2007.

Controversies 

According to the organization, the organization headquarters were attacked and vandalized twice - once in 2007, and another time in 2008. Police refused to start an investigation, because according to them, the amount of damage done is not big enough for that.

In November 2020, Atanas Kiryakov who was the OMO Ilinden mayoral candidate for the Bulgarian town of Blagoevgrad posted on his Facebook page two posts that were referencing the ethnic Macedonians welcoming the Army of North Macedonia, liberating the Blagoevgrad District, Bulgaria. This was perceived negatively in Bulgaria and was seen as promoting the weird idea of an invasion of Bulgaria by North Macedonia.

See also
 Ethnic Macedonians in Bulgaria

References

Sources
Maknews: Interview with Stojko Stojkov, Co-President of the Five Member Executive of the OMO Pirin Political Party in Pirin Macedonia
 Maknews: Interview with Jordan Kostadinov, President of OMO Ilinden in Pirin Macedonia
 Maknews: Case of Stankov and the United Macedonian Organisation Ilinden v. Bulgaria

External links
 Official site

Article 11 of the European Convention on Human Rights
Political parties in Bulgaria
European Free Alliance
Ethnic political parties